The Salamá River is a river in Guatemala. The river is fed by a number of streams running down the slopes of the Sierra de las Minas and Sierra de Chuacús and flows in a north-westerly direction through the town of Salamá until it joins the Chixoy River.

References

External links
 Map of Guatemala including the river

Rivers of Guatemala
Usumacinta River